Sarah Schleper (born February 19, 1979, in Glenwood Springs, Colorado), also known as Sarah Schleper de Gaxiola, is former American, now Mexican alpine skier with dual Mexican citizenship via her marriage to a Mexican citizen, whose career started in 1995.

Personal life
Her father is Buzz Schleper, who owns a ski shop in Vail, Colorado. She is married to Mexican Federico Gaxiola and acquired Mexican citizenship in April 2014. She is now a dual citizen and lives in Vail, and Los Cabos, Mexico.

Career
Her lone World Cup victory was at a slalom event in Switzerland in 2005. Her best finish at the FIS Alpine World Ski Championships was seventh in the slalom event at Santa Caterina (near Bormio) in 2005.

Schleper also competed in four Winter Olympics for USA, earning her best finish of tenth in the slalom event at Turin in 2006. Schleper was named to the US team for the 2010 Winter Olympics in late 2009. Schleper announced her retirement shortly before competing in her last world cup slalom on December 29, 2011, in Lienz, Austria. In her career spanning a total of 15 years, she took part in 186 World Cup races and achieved four podium finishes and one victory.

As has become traditional—a skier in her retirement race can wear any apparel she desires—Schleper wore a thin brown summer dress, bare-armed and bare-legged, and stopped halfway down the course to pick up her 4-year-old son.  She then skied the rest of the course with the boy in her arms, to the enjoyment of the crowd and fellow skiers. Lindsey Vonn gave Schleper a long hug in the finish area, and race organizers presented her with a huge bouquet of roses. 

After acquiring Mexican citizenship in April 2014, she came out of retirement in June 2014, to represent Mexico. She raced for Mexico in the women's giant slalom at the FIS Alpine World Ski Championships 2015. When she joined the Mexican ski team, she doubled the size of the team, serving alongside Prince Hubertus of Hohenlohe-Langenburg, a long time sole representative for Mexico at the world circuit.

Schleper competed for Mexico at the 2018 and 2022 Winter Olympics. Her Olympic effort is self-funded. She represents one of two athletes for Alpine Mexico, the other being Rodolfo Dickson. She qualified for the 2018 Olympics, alongside alpinist Rodolfo Dickson, freestyler Roberto Franco, and cross-country skier German Madrazo.

World Cup results

Season standings

Race podiums
1 win – (1 SL)
4 podiums – (3 SL, 1 GS)

World Championship results

Olympic results

References

External links
 
 Sarah's U.S. Olympic Team bio
 

1979 births
People from Glenwood Springs, Colorado
Alpine skiers at the 1998 Winter Olympics
Alpine skiers at the 2002 Winter Olympics
Alpine skiers at the 2006 Winter Olympics
Alpine skiers at the 2010 Winter Olympics
Alpine skiers at the 2018 Winter Olympics
Alpine skiers at the 2022 Winter Olympics
American female alpine skiers
Olympic alpine skiers of the United States
Mexican female alpine skiers
Olympic alpine skiers of Mexico
Naturalized citizens of Mexico
Living people
21st-century American women